Sharaf is an Arabic origin surname and masculine given name. Notable people with the name include:

Surname
 Abdelhamid Sharaf (1939–1980), Jordanian politician
 Essam Sharaf (born 1952), Egyptian academic and politician
 Hisham Sharaf (born 1956), Yemeni civil engineer and politician
 Jayda Sharaf (born 2001), Egyptian artistic swimmer
 Leila A. Sharaf (born 1940), Lebanese Jordanian politician
 Mohammed Sharaf (born 1961), Emirati businessman
 Nouran Sharaf (born 1985), Egyptian volleyball player
 Omar Sharaf (1925–1993), Egyptian diplomat
 Omran Sharaf (born 1984), Emirati engineer
 Sami Sharaf (1929–2023), Egyptian military officer and politician
 Samson Simon Sharaf, Pakistani military officer
 Sherif Fawaz Sharaf (born 1938), Jordanian diplomat

Stage name
 Wael Sharaf, stage name of Wael Subhi Al Rifai (born 1977), Syrian actor and film director

Given name
 Sharaf bin Rajeh (1881–1955), regent of the Kingdom of Iraq

See also
 Shah Sharaf (1640–1724), Punjabi Sufi poet
 Sharaf, disambiguation page

Surnames of Egyptian origin
Surnames of Emirati origin
Arabic masculine given names
Surnames of Jordanian origin